Diva Gray is an American singer. She is best known as a background vocalist behind the band Chic, as well as in disco groups, including Change, and Lemon with Lani Groves, Gordon Grody, Luther Vandross, David Lasley and Kenny Lehman, and in Bette Midler's female backing group, The Harlettes with Ula Hedwig and Jocelyn Brown. As a solo performer, she recorded the album "Hotel Paradise", produced by Luigi Ojival and released on Columbia Records. Diva Gray & Oyster's "Saint Tropez" was a hit single on the French charts.

Discography
Hotel Paradise (Columbia Records - JC 36265)

References

External links
Diva Gray at Discogs
Diva Gray at Bandcamp
Diva Gray at SITE123
Diva Gray at Facebook

American sopranos
American women singers
American dance musicians
Columbia Records artists
American disco singers
Change (band) members